Glyn Robert Creaser (born 1 September 1959) is an English former professional footballer who played as a defender in the Football League, and is now a manager.

Career
Having worked as a coach at a number of clubs, including New Bradwell St Peter, in 2010, Creaser took up the role of first team coach at Aylesbury United, and in October 2015 he was appointed as the club's manager. He left the club in December 2017.

Honours
Wycombe Wanderers
FA Trophy: 1990–91

References

1959 births
Living people
English footballers
Association football defenders
Kettering Town F.C. players
Yeovil Town F.C. players
Wycombe Wanderers F.C. players
Barnet F.C. players
Rushden & Diamonds F.C. players
Dagenham & Redbridge F.C. players
English Football League players
English football managers
Aylesbury United F.C. managers